Johnny "Big Moose" Walker (June 27, 1927 November 27, 1999) was an American Chicago blues and electric blues pianist and organist. He worked with many blues musicians, including Ike Turner, Sonny Boy Williamson II, Lowell Fulson, Choker Campbell, Elmore James, Earl Hooker, Muddy Waters, Otis Spann, Sunnyland Slim, Jimmy Dawkins and Son Seals.

Walker was primarily a piano player but was also proficient on the electronic organ and the bass guitar (he played the bass guitar when backing Muddy Waters). He recorded solo albums and accompanied other musicians in concert and on recordings.

Life and career
John Mayon Walker was born in the unincorporated community of Stoneville, Mississippi, partly of Native American ancestry. He acquired his best-known stage name in his childhood in Greenville, Mississippi, derived from his long, flowing hair. He learned to play several instruments, including the church organ, guitar, vibraphone and tuba.

He began his musical career as a pianist, in 1947, touring with various blues bands and backing such notable artists as Ike Turner, Sonny Boy Williamson II, Elmore James, Lowell Fulson and Choker Campbell. Walker served in the United States Army from 1952 to 1955, serving during the Korean War. In 1955, billed as Moose John, Ultra Records released the single, "Talkin' 'Bout Me". His own recordings, released under various names, were unsuccessful, but Walker started working more consistently in the mid-1950s, notably backing Earl Hooker and Elmore James. Walker moved to Chicago in the late 1950s and over the next decade accompanied Sunnyland Slim, Otis Rush, Muddy Waters (for whom Walker played bass guitar), Ricky Allen, Little Johnny Jones, and Howlin' Wolf. In 1960, he accompanied Junior Wells on his best-known recording, "Messin' with the Kid". The following year Walker played on James's recordings of "Look on Yonder Wall" and "Shake Your Moneymaker". In 1962, Walker played on Waters's recording of "You Shook Me". During the 1960s, a couple of obscure Chicago-based record labels, Age and The Blues, released Walker's solo singles.

By 1969, Walker had rejoined Earl Hooker and played on the latter's album Don't Have to Worry (ABC Bluesway). After Hooker's death in 1970, Walker played backing for Jimmy Dawkins, Mighty Joe Young and Louis Myers. His debut album, Ramblin' Woman, was issued in 1970 by ABC. He provided piano accompaniment on Andrew Odom's album Farther on the Road and on If You Miss 'Im...I Got 'Im, by John Lee Hooker, featuring Earl Hooker.

In December 1979, Willie James Lyons played guitar on Walker's album, Going Home Tomorrow.

Alligator Records utilised Walker's playing on their Living Chicago Blues series of recordings. He toured Europe in 1979 with the Chicago Blues Festival. His second album, Blue Love, was released in 1984. He later toured in New Zealand and Canada. He recorded with Son Seals and performed at the Burnley Blues Festival, in England, in 1991. Walker had a stroke prior to this engagement, and subsequent strokes left him unable to perform. Evidence Music reissued Blue Love in 1996, with five bonus tracks.

Walker lived in a nursing home in Chicago before his death, at the age of 72, in November 1999.

Discography

Solo albums

Collaboration albums

As sideman
With Earl Hooker
Don't Have to Worry (BluesWay, 1969)
With John Lee Hooker
If You Miss 'Im...I Got 'Im (BluesWay, 1970) with Earl Hooker
With Lightnin' Hopkins
Lightnin'! (Poppy, 1969)
In the Key of Lightnin' (Tomato, 1969 [2002])
With Curtis Jones
Trouble Blues (Bluesville, 1960)

See also
List of Chicago blues musicians
 List of electric blues musicians

References

External links
 
 Photographs of Walker
 Biography and discography

1927 births
1999 deaths
20th-century American singers
American blues pianists
American male pianists
American organists
American male organists
American blues guitarists
American male bass guitarists
American blues singers
Blues bass guitarists
Blues musicians from Mississippi
Chicago blues musicians
Electric blues musicians
Organ blues musicians
People from Washington County, Mississippi
20th-century American bass guitarists
20th-century American pianists
Guitarists from Illinois
Guitarists from Mississippi
20th-century organists
20th-century American male singers
20th-century American keyboardists
United States Army personnel of the Korean War